Courthouse Mountain is a  mountain summit located on the shared boundary of Hinsdale County with Ouray County, in southwest Colorado, United States. It is situated 10.5 miles east of the community of Ridgway, and south of Owl Creek Pass, in the Uncompahgre Wilderness, on land managed by Uncompahgre National Forest. It is part of the San Juan Mountains which are a subset of the Rocky Mountains, and is situated west of the Continental Divide. The mountain's name, which has been officially adopted by the United States Board on Geographic Names, was in use before 1906 when Henry Gannett published it in the Gazetteer of Colorado.

Climate 
According to the Köppen climate classification system, Courthouse Mountain is located in an alpine subarctic climate zone with cold, snowy winters, and cool to warm summers. Due to its altitude, it receives precipitation all year, as snow in winter, and as thunderstorms in summer, with a dry period in late spring. Precipitation runoff from the east side of the mountain drains into tributaries of the Cimarron River, and from the west side into Uncompahgre River via Cow Creek.

See also 

 Chimney Rock
 Precipice Peak
 Geology of Colorado

References

External links 

 Weather forecast: Courthouse Mountain
 Courthouse Mountain Trail: US Forest Service
 Chimney Rock and Courthouse Mountain photo: Flickr

Mountains of Ouray County, Colorado
Mountains of Hinsdale County, Colorado
San Juan Mountains (Colorado)
Mountains of Colorado
North American 3000 m summits
Uncompahgre National Forest